The 2013 Pocono IndyCar 400 fueled by Sunoco, the twentieth running of the event, was an IndyCar Series race held on July 7, 2013, at the Pocono Raceway in Long Pond, Pennsylvania. The race was the eleventh in the 2013 IndyCar Series season. The event made a return to the IndyCar schedule after a 23-year hiatus. Marco Andretti of Andretti Autosport won the pole position, while Chip Ganassi Racing driver Scott Dixon won the race.

Report

Background
Pocono Raceway held an IndyCar race from 1971–1989, though as a 500-mile race, with the event ending after Pocono owner Joseph Mattioli chose not to return, citing the rivalry between the USAC and CART as a factor. The final race at the track was won by Danny Sullivan.

On October 1, 2012, IndyCar announced that the Pocono race will make a return for 2013. However, the race was shortened by 100 miles to 400, as a request by ABC to fit the time window. The race became a part of the IndyCar Triple Crown of Motorsport, in which if a driver wins the Indianapolis 500, the Pocono IndyCar 400, and the season-ending MAVTV 500, they will win $1 million.

The first ten races of the 2013 season were split by Andretti Autosport and other teams, with Andretti drivers James Hinchcliffe winning three races and teammate Ryan Hunter-Reay winning two. The other five races were won by Takuma Sato (A. J. Foyt Enterprises), Tony Kanaan (KV Racing Technology), Mike Conway (Dale Coyne Racing), Simon Pagenaud (Sam Schmidt Motorsports) and Hélio Castroneves (Team Penske).

This would ultimately be the final IndyCar race for ESPN color commentator Marty Reid after 31 years working with ESPN. Reid would later call his final race at the NASCAR Nationwide Series 2013 Alsco 300 at Kentucky Speedway, before retiring at the end of 2013.

Qualifying
Andretti's teammates Ryan Hunter-Reay and James Hinchcliffe started second and third, respectively. The last time a team swept the front row in qualifying was in the 1988 Indianapolis 500 with Penske Racing. Will Power started fourth, while Tony Kanaan and Hélio Castroneves started fifth and sixth, respectively. Scott Dixon (Takuma Sato, Simon Pagenaud and Simona de Silvestro rounded out the top ten. Meanwhile, the fourth Andretti driver, E. J. Viso, was in position to start in fourth until he hit the wall during qualifying; Alex Tagliani had also hit the wall while qualifying. Viso and Tagliani started 22nd and 24th, respectively. For Dixon, despite qualifying in seventh, was penalized ten spots due to conflicts between manufacturer Honda and IndyCar regarding the  engine change rule. Dixon was not the only driver penalized for unapproved engine changes; among those forced to move back were: Dario Franchitti, Pippa Mann, Justin Wilson, Viso and Tagliani.

Race

The race started with James Hinchcliffe hitting the turn 1 wall on the first lap. Later, on lap 61, his teammate Ryan Hunter-Reay was hit from behind by Takuma Sato while entering pit lane, suffering right front wheel and right wing damage, and was forced to go to the garage. The other Andretti Autosport driver on the front row, Marco Andretti, led 88 laps, but ran out of fuel as he crossed the finish line. For the other competitors, Scott Dixon, who had led only one lap all season (at the Indianapolis 500), led 38 laps, including the final 28 laps, and guided Chip Ganassi Racing to its 100th win, Honda's 200th win, and Dixon's 30th career victory. The win was Dixon's first since 2012 at Mid-Ohio. His teammates Charlie Kimball and Dario Franchitti finished second and third, marking the first time a team swept the podium since 2011, when Team Penske had Will Power, Hélio Castroneves and Ryan Briscoe in the top three at Sonoma Raceway, and at a Triple Crown race since Bobby Unser, Rick Mears and Mario Andretti of Team Penske finished in the top three spots at Ontario Motor Speedway in 1979. Power finished fourth, Josef Newgarden fifth, Simon Pagenaud sixth, Justin Wilson, Castroneves, Ed Carpenter, and Andretti closed out the top ten. Hunter-Reay finished 20th, and Hinchcliffe finished 24th.

Indianapolis 500 winner Tony Kanaan led portions of the race, but at lap 109 he clipped his front wing passing Scott Dixon for the lead. While Kanaan was able to continue, the team was forced to change the front wing under green flag conditions ending any chance Kanaan had at winning the second leg of the triple crown. Kanaan finished a disappointing 13th.

References

Pocono IndyCar 400
Pocono IndyCar 400
Pocono IndyCar 400
Motorsport in Pennsylvania
Pocono Mountains